Justin Lewis Scott (born August 26, 1986), better known by his stage name Big K.R.I.T. (a backronym for King Remembered in Time), is an American rapper and record producer. Born in Meridian, Mississippi, he started his musical career in 2005. After signing with Def Jam Recordings, K.R.I.T. gained notable recognition following the release of his single, "Country Shit", which featured Ludacris and Bun B on the remix. In June 2012, he released his debut studio album, Live from the Underground, which debuted at number five on the Billboard 200 chart.

K.R.I.T.'s second album, Cadillactica, released in November 2014, also peaked at number five on the Billboard 200. In 2016, he announced that he is no longer signed to Def Jam, and the next year launched his own record label Multi Alumni. He released his third album, 4eva Is a Mighty Long Time, under his label Multi Alumni in October 2017.

Career

2005–2010: Beginnings
K.R.I.T. previously released several mixtapes, including Hood Fame, with DJ Wally Sparks and The Last King, with DJ Breakem Off. He also made guest appearances on Pilot Talk, the third studio album and major label debut from rapper Curren$y, as well as Kush & Orange Juice, the critically acclaimed mixtape by rapper Wiz Khalifa. When he started branding himself, he went by the name of Kritikal, before shortening it to K.R.I.T.

In May 2010, K.R.I.T. released his mixtape, K.R.I.T. Wuz Here, digitally, garnering critical acclaim. That same month, former president of G-Unit Records and current Senior VP of A&R at Def Jam Records, Sha Money XL, signed him to the label as one of his first priorities in his new position.

In October 2010, K.R.I.T. co-headlined The Smoker's Club Tour 2010 alongside fellow rappers Curren$y and Smoke DZA. In November 2010, K.R.I.T. opened for Wiz Khalifa in Baltimore, Maryland Sayreville, New Jersey Winston-Salem, North Carolina and in Ashland, Virginia during the Waken Baken Tour.

2011–2015: Live from the Underground and Cadillactica

In early 2011, he was featured on the cover of XXL as part of their annual Top Freshmen of the year, along with the likes of other rappers including Meek Mill, Cyhi the Prynce, Lil Twist, Yelawolf, Fred the Godson, Mac Miller, YG, Lil B, Kendrick Lamar and Diggy Simmons.

In March 2011, K.R.I.T. released his highly anticipated and entirely self-produced mixtape, Return of 4Eva, featuring guests David Banner, Joi, Big Sant, Chamillionaire, Raheem DeVaughn, Ludacris, and Bun B. The mixtape has been acclaimed by rap critics, with William Ketchum of HipHopDX calling it "emotive, conceptual music" and saying that K.R.I.T. had given fans a "free album" – the magazine's highest praise for a mixtape. Meanwhile, Matthew Cole of Slant Magazine highlighted Return of 4Eva in his mixtape review column as "the best mixtape of the month," going on in a separate review to call it "the rap album to beat in 2011 ". Both critics praised K.R.I.T.'s production skills as much as his lyrics and flow, and both named K.R.I.T. as a likely successor to Southern rap legends UGK, Scarface, and Outkast. On April 20, 2011, Tom Breihan reviewed the mixtape for Pitchfork, giving an 8.2 out of 10 and awarding it the site's coveted "Best New Music" tag.

On July 1, 2011, K.R.I.T. announced the title of his debut studio album to be, Live from the Underground. It was originally set to be released on September 27, 2011. From October 12, 2011, until November 24, 2011, K.R.I.T. co-headlined The Smoker's Club Tour 2011 with Curren$y and Method Man. K.R.I.T. released Live from the Underground June 5, 2012, to tremendous expectancy. It debuted at number one on the Hip Hop, R&B, and Rap Charts. He released his first single off the album titled, "I Got This" on May 7, 2012. He went on the "Live from the Underground" tour, which he headlined along with Slim Thug. In an interview on Bootleg Kev's radio show, on August 10, 2012, he confirmed that he and fellow Southern rapper Yelawolf were working on a collaborative album entitled Country Cousins. During the same interview, he was also asked about his favorite rappers, to which he responded, "Scarface. Man, I need these people in groups. Can I put the rest as a group? Outkast, UGK and 8Ball & MJG. That's what my iTunes consists of." K.R.I.T. along with singer Ashthon Jones collaborated with Lecrae for his single "Mayday" from Gravity.

On January 10, 2013, K.R.I.T. announced his next mixtape as King Remembered In Time. Also naming Mike WiLL Made It as a producer on both the mixtape and his next album. He went on to indicate this mixtape and his next album would not be entirely produced by himself like his previous works, with his album not being produced by himself at all. The first single off the mixtape was released on February 27, 2013, titled, "Shine On". The song features rapper Bun B and was produced by K.R.I.T. He has also put out songs produced by 9th Wonder. K.R.I.T. (King Remembered In Time) would be released on April 10, 2013. The mixtape features primary production handled by K.R.I.T. himself and guest appearances by Wiz Khalifa, Future, Smoke DZA and Trinidad James among others.

On June 13, 2013, in an interview with Dead End Hip Hop, K.R.I.T. hinted towards the title of his upcoming second studio album, stating that the title is featured in the opening seconds of the Intro from his debut album "Live from the Underground". In August 2013, he told HipHopDX that Chad Hugo of The Neptunes, DJ Dahi and Terrace Martin will provide some of the album's soulful production. K.R.I.T. also said he has refocused his energy on his rhymes and delivery, as he allows producers to craft some of the beats for him. On September 30, 2013, K.R.I.T. announced that his second album would be called Cadillactica. In October 2013, he told XXL that Jim Jonsin, Rico Love, DJ Toomp, and himself would also provide production on the album. On April 28, 2014, he released the first single off his second album, titled "Mt. Olympus". The second single from Cadillatica, "Pay Attention" released July 25, 2014. In an interview with HipHopSince1987, Big K.R.I.T. revealed a November 11 release date for Cadillactica.

2016–present: 4eva Is a Mighty Long Time and K.R.I.T. iz Here
After releasing twelve freestyles in twelve hours, K.R.I.T. announced through Twitter that he and Def Jam had parted ways on July 6, 2016.

On October 27, 2017, K.R.I.T. released his third studio album, 4eva Is a Mighty Long Time. The album marks K.R.I.T.'s first independent release under his Multi Alumni label, following a departure from Def Jam. It debuted at number seven on the Billboard 200. The album was supported by four singles: "Confetti", "Keep the Devil Off", "Aux Cord" and "1999".

On July 12, 2019, K.R.I.T. released his fourth studio album, K.R.I.T. Iz Here.

On February 18, 2022, K.R.I.T. released his fifth studio album, Digital Roses Don't Die.

Artistry

Big K.R.I.T.'s musical training began in elementary school up through junior high school playing the cello, and having the ability to read music helped him out tremendously as an artist. While talking about how he started producing music, K.R.I.T. said: "At the time, I was young and I didn't have no job. It wasn't like I could really afford to pay for beats. At the same time, there was this program that came out for PlayStation, MTV Music Generator, where you could make your own beats. So I started making my own beats right around that time because I just couldn't afford to pay for the other ones." K.R.I.T. has cited UGK, Outkast, 8Ball & MJG, Tupac Shakur, The Notorious B.I.G., David Banner and CeeLo Green as his influences.

Big K.R.I.T. is known in Birmingham, Alabama as being one of the favorite artists of the current Birmingham Mayor, Randall L. Woodfin. "Mt. Olympus (Reprise)" and "Energy" were featured on Mayor Woodfin's Mayoral Mixtape, which was released on Spotify in the summer of 2021.

Discography

Live from the Underground (2012)
Cadillactica (2014)
4eva Is a Mighty Long Time (2017)
K.R.I.T. Iz Here (2019)
Digital Roses Don't Die (2022)

Awards and nominations

References

External links

 
 

1986 births
African-American male rappers
African-American record producers
American hip hop record producers
Def Jam Recordings artists
Living people
Musicians from Meridian, Mississippi
Rappers from Mississippi
Southern hip hop musicians
21st-century American rappers
21st-century American male musicians
21st-century African-American musicians
20th-century African-American people